Lynn G. Brenne (October 3, 1911 – February 5, 1993) was an American politician and businessman.

Brenne was born in Cleveland, Ohio. He went to Cleveland College, Yale College, and the Freight Traffic Institute of Chicago. Brenne moved to Illinois in 1936 and settled in Park Forest, Illinois in 1949. He served in the United States Army Air Forces during World War II and was a radar officer. Brenne worked for the Greyhound Corporation and the United Airlines. Brenne served on the Park Forest Village Board and was involved with the Republican Party. He served in the Illinois House of Representatives in 1971 and 1972. Brenne died at his home in Park Forest, Illinois.

Notes

1911 births
1993 deaths
Politicians from Cleveland
People from Park Forest, Illinois
United States Army Air Forces officers
Military personnel from Illinois
Military personnel from Ohio
Yale College alumni
Businesspeople from Illinois
Illinois city council members
Republican Party members of the Illinois House of Representatives
20th-century American politicians
20th-century American businesspeople
United States Army Air Forces personnel of World War II